Yusi may refer to:

Tattler (Chinese periodical) (語絲), a Chinese literary periodical in the 1920s
Yusi, Liaoning (于寺), a town in Fuxin Mongol Autonomous County, Liaoning, China
Yusi, Sichuan (喻寺), a town in Lu County, Sichuan, China
 Yusi, one of the main characters in the Russian animated series Qumi-Qumi

See also
Yu Si (218–?), Eastern Wu official